The Bioethics Bowl is an intercollegiate, academic competition among undergraduate students at accredited four-year institutions of higher education. It takes place each April on a college campus. 
	Unlike the Intercollegiate Ethics Bowl, which debates cases across the curriculum from agricultural and engineering ethics to issues of grade inflation and communications, the Bioethics Bowl focuses exclusively on ethical issues in the health and biological sciences.

Format 

In late January or early February, the competing teams, judges, and moderators receive 15 case studies which represent controversial bioethical issues. The goals for each team is both to do research on the cases and to formulate well-structured, logical analyses pertaining to 3 questions posed (in advance) about each case.

In each round, the first team gets one of the 12-15 cases randomly assigned plus one of the 3 questions from the moderator. The first team then has 10 minutes to present: (1) the central moral issues of the cases, and (2) alternative points of view. The responding team then comments for 5 minutes on the first team's analysis, and the first team then responds for 5 more minutes to these comments. Finally, a panel of 3 judges asks questions for 10 minutes to the presenting team. The judges then pause to evaluate the first teams' response and the second team's comments. The round then repeats this format with the second team receiving a question about a different case.

History  

It began in 2008 at Union College in Schenectady, New York in connection with the 11th National Undergraduate Bioethics Conference, (which consisted of outside speakers for students’ and poster presentations by students). 

Michael Mathias, who coached Union’s Ethics Bowl team from 2003 to 2007, organized the first Bioethics Bowl at  Union College, with the help of Bob Baker. It had 11 cases and six teams. Bob Ladenson and Patrick Croskery, founders of the Ethics Bowl, enthusiastically supported this new Bowl.

The following year, Harvard University hosted in Cambridge, MA. Bioethicist Peter Singer  then gave the keynote address and 12 teams participated.

	By 2017, the burden of supporting NUBC as a conference organized by undergraduates grew too much, when the Bioethics Bowl also almost collapsed.

In 2017, to keep something going, Richard Greene and Rachel Robinson of Weber State University in Ogden, UT, agreed to keep the Bioethics Bowl alone going. Fifteen teams participated that year. Ann Jeffrey of the University of South Alabama then stepped forward and kept the Bowl going for two more years there.

Since 2017, the Bioethics Bowl has existed on its own and is governed by a small executive committee. In 2019, the Prindle Institute for Ethics in Greencastle, IN became an official sponsor of the Bioethics Bowl, hosting its web site, registration and other administrative details.

History of Competitions

In 2008, Union College hosted the first Bioethics Bowl.  In the finals, National Hispanic University of San Jose, CA defeated the University of Miami.

In 2009, Harvard University hosted in Cambridge, MA. In the finals, the University of North Carolina at Chapel Hill defeated the University of Miami. 
 
In 2010, the University of Puget Sound hosted. In the finals, the University of Denver defeated the University of Miami.

In 2011, Duke University hosted in Durham, NC. In the finals, the University of Alabama at Birmingham defeated Georgetown University. 

In 2012, the University of Denver hosted. In the finals, DePauw University defeated Georgetown University. 

In 2013, Georgetown University hosted. In the finals Georgetown University defeated the University of Denver. 

In 2014, Loyola University-Chicago hosted at its downtown campus. In the finals, Loyola University-Chicago defeated Georgetown University.

In 2015, Florida State University hosted in Tallahassee and in the finals, the University of Alabama at Birmingham defeated Samford University.

In 2016, Case Western Reserve University hosted in Cleveland, Ohio and in the finals, Loyola University-Chicago defeated Georgetown University.

In 2017, Weber State University in Ogden, Utah hosted, and in the finals, the University of Portland defeated Georgetown University.  

In 2018, the University of South Alabama hosted in Mobile, AL and in the finals, the University of Portland defeated DePauw University. 

In 2019, the University of South Alabama hosted in Mobile, AL and in the finals, the University of Alabama at Birmingham defeated Georgetown University. 

In 2020, Northeastern University planned to host the Bioethics Bowl in Boston, MA, but the pandemic forced its cancellation.

In 2021, Oklahoma State University hosted a special virtual competition of 16 teams in 3 rounds, where Macalester College triumphed over second-place (tie)  San Jose State University and University of Alabama at Birmingham.

In 2022, the Bioethics Bowl occurred at Westminster College in Salt Lake City on April 9th where Loyola University Chicago defeated Northeastern University in the final match.

in 2023, Northeastern University will host the next Bioethics Bowl.

References

Bioethics
Debating competitions
Philosophy events